Ekspress-A4 ( meaning Express-A4), is a Russian communications satellite which is operated by Russian Satellite Communications Company (RSCC). It was constructed by NPO PM and Alcatel Space and is based on the MSS-2500-GSO satellite bus.

Satellite 
The launch was contracted by Khrunichev State Research and Production Space Center, and used a Proton-K / Blok DM-2M launch vehicle flying from Site 200/39 at the Baikonur Cosmodrome.

Launch 
Ekspress-A4 is a Russian geosynchronous communications spacecraft that was launched on 10 June 2002 from Baikonur by a Proton-K launch vehicle at 01:14:00 UTC. The  spacecraft carries 12 transponders in C-band and five in Ku-band to provide voice, data, and video communications in Russia.

Mission 
It is part of the Ekspress network of satellites. Following its launch and on-orbit testing, it was placed in geostationary orbit at 40° West, from where it provides communications services to Russia. It is equipped with seventeen transponders. In January 2020, the satellite was retired and moved to a graveyard orbit above the geostationary orbit.

References 

Ekspress satellites
Spacecraft launched in 2002
Satellites using the KAUR bus